Antenor was a Greek writer of uncertain date, wrote a work upon the history of Crete, which on account of its excellence was called Delta (Δέλτα), inasmuch as, says Ptolemy Hephaestion, the Cretans called that which is good Delton (Δέλτον).

Notes

Ancient Greek historians
History of Crete